Felicity Hunter is an Australian singer and songwriter. Her debut single "Hardcore Adore" (released when she was 16) was on high rotation nationally on Triple J. That song and two other releases earned engineer Kalju Tonuma a nomination for the 1999 ARIA Award for Engineer of the Year.

Discography
Singles
"Hardcore Adore" (1999) - Epic
"What We Made" (2000)

Album
Silence the Dark

References

External links
Official website

Australian musicians
Living people
Year of birth missing (living people)